Joey Johnson (born 26 July 1975) is a professional Canadian wheelchair basketball player. He has competed in several Paralympics and World Championships and was also the first disabled athlete to be inducted in Manitoba's Basketball Hall of Fame.

Personal 
Johnson was born on 26 July 1975 in Winnipeg, Manitoba. At age eight, he was diagnosed with Degenerative hip disease. He has a wife, Missy, and 3 children: Owen, Kamryn, and Brody.  He also has a brother, Bill Johnson, who was formerly the head coach of the Canadian Sr. Women’s Wheelchair Basketball Team. He attended the University of Wisconsin–Whitewater when he achieved a place on the Canadian National Team.

Career 
In 1996, Johnson got fifth place in the Atlanta Summer Paralympics with Team Canada. In 1998, they got third place at the Sydney World Championships. They also got second place at the Parapan American Games in Mexico City.

In 2000, they won gold at the Sydney Paralympics. In 2003, they also won gold in the Parapan American Games in Mar del Plata, Argentina. He had also won first place in National Wheelchair Basketball League with the Wollongong Roller Hawks. In 2004, Johnson won gold at the Athens Paralympics with Team Canada. He was later awarded the Paralympic Sport Award for best team performance in 2005.

Johnson won gold in the 2006 World Championships in Amsterdam, Netherlands with Team Canada and was named an "All-star". In 2007, they came second at the Parapan American Games in Rio de Janeiro, Brazil.

They won silver in the 2008 Beijing Paralympics. They won seventh in the World Championships at Birmingham, UK in 2010. In 2011, they got third in the Parapan American Games in Guadalajara, Mexico and first place at the 2012 London Paralympic Games with Team Canada.

After the 2012 Paralympics, Johnson retired.

Awards 

In 2013, Johnson was inducted into Manitoba Basketball Hall of Fame becoming the first Paralympic athlete to be inducted.

References

External links 
 
 

1975 births
Living people
Canadian men's wheelchair basketball players
Paralympic wheelchair basketball players of Canada
Paralympic gold medalists for Canada
Paralympic silver medalists for Canada
Paralympic medalists in wheelchair basketball
Wheelchair basketball players at the 1996 Summer Paralympics
Wheelchair basketball players at the 2000 Summer Paralympics
Wheelchair basketball players at the 2004 Summer Paralympics
Wheelchair basketball players at the 2008 Summer Paralympics
Wheelchair basketball players at the 2012 Summer Paralympics
Medalists at the 2000 Summer Paralympics
Medalists at the 2004 Summer Paralympics
Medalists at the 2008 Summer Paralympics
Medalists at the 2012 Summer Paralympics
Sportspeople from Winnipeg
University of Wisconsin–Whitewater alumni